Deep Instinct is a cybersecurity company that applies deep learning to cybersecurity. The company implements advanced artificial intelligence to the task of preventing and detecting malware. The company was the recipient of the Technology Pioneer by The World Economic Forum in 2017.

Overview 
In 2015, Deep Instinct was founded by Guy Caspi, Dr. Eli David, and Nadav Maman. The headquarters of the company is located in New York City.

In July 2017, NVIDIA became an investor. According to Tom's Hardware, NVIDIA’s investment enabled access to a GPU-based neural network and CUDA platform, which they were using to achieve maximum vulnerability detection rates. As of February 2020, the company has raised $43 million in Series C funding round.

In April 2019, Deep Instinct commissioned an art project, titled The Persistence of Chaos, by Chinese artist, Guo O Dong, consisting of a laptop infected with 6 pieces of malware that represented $95 billion in damages. The art was auctioned with a final bid of $1,345,000.

In 2019, Globes reported that, HP Inc partnered with Deep Instinct to launch their security solution HP SureSense, which has been applied to the EliteBook and Zbook devices.

In April 2021, Deep Instict Closes $100 Million Series D to accelerate growth.

References

External links 

Computer security companies
Computer security organizations
Deep learning
Technology companies of Israel
Software companies established in 2014
2014 establishments in Israel